Gartz Court is a bungalow court located at 745 N. Pasadena Ave. in Pasadena, California. The court consists of five buildings containing six residential units, which surround an oval rose garden and walkways. Built in 1910, the court, along with Bowen Court, is one of the oldest remaining in Pasadena. The court was commissioned by Kate Crane Gartz, the heir to Crane Plumbing, and was designed by Myron Hunt and Elmer Grey. The homes' designs were influenced by the English Arts and Crafts Movement and feature stone chimneys, wood shingled skirts, and Tudor Revival-style half-timbering. The court was originally located at 270 N. Madison Ave., but was moved to its current location in 1984 to save it from demolition.

The court was added to the National Register of Historic Places on August 25, 1983.

References

External links

Bungalow courts
Bungalow architecture in California
Houses in Pasadena, California
Houses completed in 1910
Houses on the National Register of Historic Places in California
National Register of Historic Places in Pasadena, California
Myron Hunt buildings